The Defense of Sihang Warehouse  took place from October 26 to November 1, 1937, and marked the beginning of the end of the three-month Battle of Shanghai in the opening phase of the Second Sino-Japanese War. Defenders of the warehouse held out against numerous waves of Japanese forces and covered Chinese forces retreating west during the Battle of Shanghai.

The successful defense of the warehouse provided a morale-lifting consolation to the Chinese army and people in the demoralizing aftermath of the Japanese invasion of Shanghai. The warehouse's location just across the Suzhou Creek from the foreign concessions in Shanghai meant the battle took place in full view of the western powers.

It was across from the foreign concessions in Shanghai, and the Japanese did not dare to call naval artillery strikes on the area, since a stray shot might land in the concessions and provoke an incident with the Europeans and Americans, whom the Japanese wanted to keep out of the war. Moreover, the Japanese dared not use mustard gas here as they did elsewhere in Shanghai, in full view of the foreign powers. This proximity drew the attention, if only briefly, of the international community to Chiang Kai-shek's bid for worldwide support against Japanese aggression.

In Chinese, the 452 defenders are known as the Eight Hundred Heroes, because commander Xie Jinyuan, not wanting to reveal their true strength to the Japanese, provided an exaggerated number to girl guide Yang Huimin to announce to the public.

Background

Using the Marco Polo Bridge Incident as a pretext, the Japanese Imperial Army launched an invasion of China on 7 July 1937. As the Imperial Japanese Army swept down from the north, fighting between Chinese and Japanese forces started in Shanghai on 13 August. Despite having logistical problems, inferior training, and a lack of air and artillery support, the Chinese held on to Shanghai City, much of it reduced to ruins.

However, the Japanese did not attack the foreign concessions in the city and remained on peaceable terms with the foreign powers, though tensions were high. They did not occupy the concessions until four years later, following Japan's decision to go to war against the Allies.

By 26 October 1937, Chinese resistance in the district of Zhabei was faltering. Generalissimo Chiang Kai-shek wanted to withdraw all forces in the area to defend the rural western regions of Shanghai, and ordered Gu Zhutong, acting commander of the 3rd Military Region, to leave the 88th Division behind to buy time and canvass international support by showing the other nations of the Nine Powers (which were to convene on 6 November) China's determination to resist the Japanese war of aggression.

Gu was personally attached to the 88th and unwilling to leave the division behind, as he used to be the commanding officer of the 2nd Division, which became the 88th after reorganisation. He telegraphed the 88th's divisional commander Sun Yuanliang, who vehemently opposed this plan and sent his chief of staff Zhang Boting (張柏亭) to Gu's Headquarters, about 20 km from the frontlines, to argue against it.

Neither Gu, Sun nor Zhang were about to disobey Chiang's orders, but Sun (via Zhang) suggested to Gu that the number of troops left to cover the withdrawal would not matter for such a show of determination. In his words, "How many people we sacrifice would not make a difference; it would achieve the same purpose."  He proposed that a single regiment from the division be left behind to defend one or two fortified positions, and Gu approved this plan. Zhang returned to the 88th's divisional headquarters at Sihang Warehouse. There, Sun decided that even a regiment would be a terrible waste of lives and decided on a single over-strength battalion instead. Xie Jinyuan (謝晉元), a relatively new commander in the 88th Division, volunteered to lead the battalion.

At 10 p.m. on 26 October, the 524th Regiment, based at the Shanghai North Railway Station, received orders to withdraw to the divisional headquarters at Sihang Warehouse. 1st Battalion commander Yang Ruifu was distraught at having to abandon a position he had held for more than two months, but agreed to do so after being shown Sun's orders for the 1st Battalion to defend Sihang Warehouse.

The warehouse, also known as the Chinese Mint Godown by those from the concessions, is a six-story concrete building situated in Zhabei District north of Suzhou Creek, at the north-western edge of New Lese Bridge (now North Tibet Road Bridge). The warehouse, used as the divisional headquarters of the 88th Division prior to this battle, was stocked with food, first aid equipment, shells and ammunition.

Order of battle and equipment

National Revolutionary Army

 524th Regiment, 88th Division: Regimental commander (CO), Army Lieutenant Colonel Xie JinyuanExecutive officer (XO), Army Major Shangguan Zhibiao (上官志標)
 1st Battalion, 524th Regiment: Battalion Commander, Army Major Yang Ruifu (楊瑞符)
1st Company, 1st Battalion: Company commander, Army Captain Tao Xingchun (陶杏春)
2nd Company, 1st Battalion: Company commander, Army Captain Deng Ying (鄧英)
3rd Company, 1st Battalion: Company commander, Army Captain Shi Meihao (石美豪, wounded), Army Captain Tang Di (唐棣)
Machine Gun Company, 1st Battalion: Company commander, Army Captain Lei Xiong (雷雄)

Initially containing around 800 men, the 1st was technically an over-strength battalion, but casualties suffered over the course of the Battle of Shanghai reduced its actual strength just prior to the battle to 452 men (some sources give 423), including officers. Because of the confusion of the general retreat, some units may have failed to make it to the warehouse, which caused a further reduction in strength, down to only 414 men present at the beginning of the battle. Two months of intense fighting had also whittled down the original German-trained troops, and after five rounds of reinforcements, the majority of soldiers and officers in the battalion were garrison troops from the surrounding provinces.

Most of the men were from the 1st Battalion, 5th Regiment of the Hubei Provincial Garrison. Hubei did not want to send its best troops to Shanghai, as these had trained over a decade to fight against the Chinese Communists. Thus, many of the soldiers sent as reinforcements to Shanghai were green recruits, with the latest batch recruited after the outbreak of war on 7 July. Official communications referred to the defenders as the 524th Regiment to mislead the Japanese as to their actual strength, even though only the 1st Battalion took part in this battle, and other elements of the regiment continued to be active well into 1939. Eventually the 1st Battalion came to be equated with the 524th Regiment, even within official documents of the period.

The regiment was assigned used equipment from the front-line troops of the 88th, and was well equipped considering the shoddy equipment that most Chinese forces had. Photos and records show that soldiers were each issued a rifle, likely a Hanyang 88 or Chiang Kai-shek rifle, 300 rounds of 8 mm Mauser, two crates of grenades, a German-made M1935 helmet, a gas mask, and food pouch. There was a total of 27 light machine guns, mostly Czech ZB vz.26, approximately one for each squad. The four water-cooled Type 24 Maxim guns were the only heavy weapons available to the battalion—a mortar platoon assigned to them was never mentioned by participants of the battle, and was therefore unlikely to have joined the battle.

Imperial Japanese Army
 Shanghai Expeditionary Army: General Iwane Matsui
 IJA 3rd Division

The Japanese 3rd Division had suffered heavy losses at the hands of the Chinese 88th Division, whom they called the "Hated Enemy of Zhabei". However, their organization, officer corps and command structure were mostly intact, and Japanese forces enjoyed air and naval superiority, as well as access to armoured vehicles, such as Type 94 tankettes. Japanese infantry used the Arisaka Type 38 Rifle, Type 11 and Type 96 light machine guns, Nambu type 14 pistol, Type 92 heavy machine gun, Type 97 grenade, Type 89 grenade discharger, and Type 93 flamethrower.

27 October

The various companies of the battalion were spread out across the front lines that night. Yang Ruifu sent the 1st Company to Sihang Warehouse and personally led the 2nd Company. The 3rd Company, Machine Gun Company and part of the 1st Company could not be contacted. What initially seemed a disastrous start to the defense was averted at nine in the morning, when these companies turned up at the warehouse, having heard the orders through word of mouth from other forces that had retreated from Zhabei. That these men essentially volunteered for this suicidal mission was later noted by Chiang Kai-shek as exemplary soldierly conduct.

In early morning, news circulated throughout Shanghai that there were still Chinese forces defending Zhabei at Sihang Warehouse. This piqued the interest of Girl Guide Yang Huimin (楊惠敏), who later played a large part in this battle. At around 4 a.m. she walked to the British guard post at the Chinese end of New Lese Bridge, where she noticed a British soldier throwing a pack of cigarettes into the warehouse.

Yang asked the soldier what he was doing, and he answered that there were Chinese soldiers inside. She wrote a message and asked the British soldier to stuff it in a pack of cigarettes and throw it over. After a while a message was thrown back saying that the soldiers in the warehouse wanted food, ammunition and lubricant for their firearms. She left the bridge and pleaded with the head of the Shanghai Chamber of Commerce, who initially did not believe her story, much to her frustration.

Xie deployed the 1st Company on the right side of the warehouse along Tibet Road, the 3rd Company on the left across from the Bank of Communications building, and the 2nd Company on the other sides. Two heavy machine guns were installed on the roof, and the other machine guns were spread out to each company. Xie noted that the fortifications built by the Nationalist Army before the war in preparation against a European attack from the foreign concessions could be used by the Japanese against the warehouse. Consequently, he ordered these fortifications to be rigged with explosives in case the Japanese tried to occupy them.

Makeshift defenses were constructed from sandbags and the sacks of corn, beans, and other merchandise stocked within the warehouse. The electric lights in the warehouse were destroyed, and some of the immediate surrounding buildings were razed to clear a killing field.

By 7 a.m. the Japanese 3rd Division had moved to the Shanghai North Railway Station, and by 1 p.m. they had reached the general vicinity of the warehouse. Around ten Japanese soldiers tried to secure the rigged fortifications and were promptly killed. At 2 p.m. a group of Chinese reconnaissance troops, led by platoon leader Yin Qiucheng (尹求成), exchanged fire with around fifty Japanese soldiers. A short while after, a Japanese company attacked the warehouse from the west, and 3rd Company commander Shi Meihao was shot in the face but continued to command the defense until he was shot again in the leg. About seventy Japanese soldiers had taken cover in a blind spot at the south-west of the warehouse, and some Chinese troops climbed on the roof and threw grenades down at the Japanese. They reported seven Japanese killed and about twenty wounded. Having failed their first assault, the Japanese set fire to the north-west section of the warehouse, which stored fuel and wood. It was put out by 5 p.m. In their wake the Japanese looted and burned Zhabei.

At 9 p.m. Yang Ruifu concluded that there would be no more Japanese attacks for the day, and ordered meals to be prepared and fortifications repaired. Two defenders were killed and four wounded on this day.

28 October

The defenders rushed to construct fortifications during the night; nobody was given any sleep. In the morning Xie contacted the Shanghai Chamber of Commerce, whose telephone number was provided by Yang Huimin.

The location of the warehouse, which has been chosen mainly for its sturdy structure and availability (already a divisional headquarters), turned out to be a fortunate one for the defenders. It was across from the foreign concessions in Shanghai, and the Japanese did not dare to call naval artillery strikes on the area, since a stray shot might land in the concessions and provoke an incident with the Europeans and Americans, whom the Japanese wanted to keep out of the war. Moreover, the Japanese dared not use mustard gas here as they did elsewhere in Shanghai, in full view of the foreign powers.

At 7 a.m. a flight of Japanese bombers circled the warehouse but did not drop any bombs, for fear of hitting the concessions. They were driven away from the warehouse by anti-aircraft fire. At 8 a.m. Xie gave a pep talk to the defenders and inspected the defenses constructed by the soldiers. While on the roof, he noticed a group of Japanese soldiers along the Suzhou River, which according to Yang Ruifu's memoirs was some 1 km (1,100 yd) away. Xie grabbed a rifle and shot; one of them promptly fell.

It started to drizzle around 3 p.m., and the fire and screen of smoke around the warehouse were gradually extinguished. The Japanese launched another major attack concentrated in the west, occupying the Bank of Communications building, and deployed cannon to the north of the warehouse. The cannon were unable to heavily damage the thick walls of the warehouse, and Japanese troops in the bank building were easily suppressed by the defenders on the roof of the warehouse, who had a higher vantage point. After two hours the Japanese gave up the attack, but managed to cut electricity and water to the warehouse.

Some time in the day, a small group of Chinese soldiers led by the 524th's executive officer Shangguan Zhibiao and battalion field surgeon Tang Pinzi (湯聘梓) arrived and joined the battle.

Meanwhile, the Shanghai Chamber of Commerce was overjoyed at the news of Chinese defenders left in Zhabei, and news of this spread quickly through radio. Crowds gathered on the southern bank of the Suzhou River in the rain, cheering the defenders on. More than ten truckloads of aid were donated by Shanghai's citizens. At night the trucks drove near the warehouse, and the defenders constructed a sandbag wall to the trucks, and then dragged the supplies into the warehouse. The unloading of supplies took four hours, during which time three soldiers were killed by Japanese fire. The defenders received food, fruits, clothing, utensils and letters from the citizens. A couple of journalists arrived at the scene, but the commanding officers were busy, and the journalists ended up only meeting Lei Xiong, the Machine Gun Company commander.

Xie arranged with the British officers in the concessions, via the Chamber of Commerce, to transport around ten heavily wounded soldiers from the battle. The British agreed, and the wounded were carried off under the cover of darkness.

The same night, the Chamber of Commerce decided to send the soldiers a flag of the Republic of China. Regiment-sized Chinese units did not carry army or national flags during the war, so when Yang Huimin delivered the flag to the warehouse, Xie had to personally accept the flag as the highest-ranking officer present. Yang Huimin asked for the soldiers' plans, to which the answer "Defend to the death!" was given. Yang Huimin, moved, asked for a list of all the soldiers' names to announce to the entire country.

As doing so would inform the Japanese of their real strength, Xie did not want to release this information. However, he did not want to disappoint Yang Huimin either. Instead, he asked someone to write down around 800 names from the original roster of the 524th Regiment, and this fake name list was given to her. According to Yang Ruifu, the wounded soldiers sent out earlier that night were also ordered to say 800 if questioned about their strength. Thus the story of the "800 Heroes" spread.

29 October

In the early morning of 29 October, residents of Shanghai found a 4-metre-wide (13 ft) flag of the Republic of China flying atop Sihang warehouse. Yang Huimin had only brought the flag, and the defenders did not have a flag pole in the warehouse. Therefore, the flag was hoisted on a makeshift pole made of two bamboo culms tied together. Only a small group of soldiers attended the flag-raising ceremony.

The crowd gathered across the river, reportedly thirty thousand strong, was jubilant, shouting "Long live the Republic of China!", while the Japanese were furious and sent aircraft to attack the flag. Because of heavy anti-aircraft fire and fear of hitting the foreign concessions, the planes soon left without destroying the flag. Meanwhile, two days of fighting had damaged or destroyed many field fortifications around the warehouse, and the warehouse itself was also damaged.

At noon the Japanese mounted their largest offensive thus far. Attacking from all directions with cannon fire and tankettes, they pushed the 3rd Company out of their defensive line at the base of the warehouse and forced the 3rd into the warehouse itself. The west side of the warehouse originally lacked windows, but the Japanese attacks conveniently opened up firing holes for the defenders. A group of Japanese soldiers tried to scale the walls to the second floor with ladders, and Xie just happened to be at the window they appeared from. He grabbed the first Japanese soldier's rifle, choked him with the other hand, pushed him off, and finally shot another Japanese soldier on the ladder before pushing the ladder off.

A private jumped off the building strapped with grenades, killing about 20 Japanese soldiers in exchange for his own life.  Chen Shusheng, a 21-year old is now recognized as sacrificing his life to ensure that the Japanese would not be successful in planting explosives to breach the West Wall.  The fighting lasted until dark, with Japanese waves now frequently supported by armoured vehicles and artillery fire. Finally, after all else had failed, they used an excavator and tried to dig a tunnel towards the warehouse. During this day's battle, Chinese citizens across the river helped the soldiers by writing on large posters, warning of the Japanese army's movements.

30 October to 1 November
The Japanese launched a new wave of attack at 7 a.m. on the 30th. There were fewer infantry assaults at the warehouse this time; the Japanese attack was mainly concentrated artillery fire. Because of the sturdy construction and the abundance of sandbags and materials with which to fortify and mend the warehouse, the defenders simply repaired the warehouse while the Japanese tried to destroy it. Artillery fire was so rapid, recalled Yang Ruifu, that there was approximately one shell every second. When night approached, the Japanese deployed several floodlights to illuminate the warehouse for their artillery to strike at. The battle on the 30th lasted the whole day, with the defenders destroying and damaging several armoured cars.

The foreigners in the concessions in Shanghai did not want the site of combat to be so close to them. With that consideration in mind, and faced with pressure from the Japanese, they agreed to try to convince the Chinese to cease resisting. On the 29th the foreigners submitted a petition to the National Government to stop the fighting "for humanitarian concerns". To Chiang, the battle was already won as most of the Chinese forces in Shanghai had successfully been redeployed to defend more favourable positions, and the defense of the warehouse now had the attention of the western world, so he gave the go-ahead for the regiment to retreat on 31 October. A meeting was arranged with the British general Telfer-Smollett through the commandant of Shanghai Auxiliary Police (上海警備), Yang Hu (楊虎), and it was decided the 524th would retreat to the foreign concessions and then rejoin the rest of the 88th Division, which had been fighting in west Shanghai. The Japanese commander Matsui Iwane also agreed and promised to let the defenders retreat, but later reneged on the deal. Xie, on the other hand, wanted to remain in the warehouse and fight to the last man. Zhang Boting finally convinced Xie to retreat.

At midnight, 1 November, Xie led 376 men in small groups toward the British concession across New Lese Bridge. Ten defenders had died during the battle, and another 27 were too heavily wounded to be moved. Consequently, these men agreed to stay behind to man the machine guns and cover the retreat of the remaining forces. During the crossing, about ten soldiers were wounded by Japanese machine gun and artillery fire. By 2 a.m. the retreat was complete.

Aftermath

After the retreat the remaining soldiers set forth to regroup with the rest of the 88th Division. However, British troops seized all their weapons and placed the soldiers under arrest. The reason was that the Japanese threatened to invade the concessions if the soldiers were allowed to leave the area. They were herded into the Italian area of the concessions and fenced off.

Chiang Kai-shek promoted every defender by a rank and awarded Xie Jinyuan and Yang Ruifu the Order of Blue Sky and White Sun.

After their incarceration, citizens of Shanghai would often visit the troops, giving them performances and entertainment. The officers opened classes for the soldiers, teaching foreign languages, mathematics, and even Christian theology. Chen Wangdao, the Chinese translator of the Communist Manifesto, also visited the camp from time to time. The soldiers spent their day doing military drills and kept their fighting spirit high. Their practice of singing the National Anthem of the Republic of China every day was continuously disrupted by the foreign authorities, until it was violently put down by White Russian mercenaries.

Faced with defeat in the Battle of Shanghai and the loss of a third of the National Revolutionary Army's best-trained troops, the failed but morale-boosting defense of Shanghai proved to the Chinese people and foreign powers alike that China was actively resisting the Japanese. The media capitalized on the defense of the warehouse and lauded the Eight Hundred Heroes, embellished from the original 414, as national heroes, and a patriotic song was also composed to encourage the people to resist Japanese aggression. However, the foreign aid that Chiang tried to canvass for did not arrive; none of the European powers delivered anything more than verbal condemnation of Japan. Only Germany and the Soviet Union provided substantial aid to China before the outbreak of war in Europe, and Germany withdrew its advisors in 1938 because of Japanese pressure.

Within the "Lost Battalion Barracks", the Heroes languished for more than three years. The Japanese had offered to free the soldiers, but only if they disarmed and left Shanghai as refugees. Xie did not agree to these terms, and after refusing numerous offers from Wang Jingwei's collaborationist government, Xie Jinyuan was assassinated on 24 April 1941 at 5 a.m. by Sergeant He Dingcheng and three others of his own troops, who were bought over by Wang Jingwei's government. He died at 6 a.m. More than 100,000 people turned up for his funeral, and he was posthumously made a brigadier general of the National Revolutionary Army.

After the Pearl Harbor attack, Japanese forces occupied the foreign concessions and captured the soldiers. They were shipped off to Hangzhou and Xiaolingwei to do hard labour. Part of the group sent to Xiaolingwei escaped, and some rejoined the Chinese forces to continue fighting the Japanese in a guerilla campaign with the New 4th Army. Thirty-six officers and soldiers were sent to Papua New Guinea to do hard labour, and in 1945 when the war went against Japan, they overpowered their captors and took them prisoner instead.

When the Chinese Civil War broke out, most of the battalion returned to civilian occupations while some choose to fight for either the nationalists or the communists. As the tide of the battle turns against the Nationalists, many officers and some former soldiers, including Girl Guide Yang Huimin, retreated to Taiwan with the Kuomintang government. Soldiers that remained in Mainland China are lauded as heroes of anti-imperialism, where they are allowed to keep their nationalist memorabilia such as their medals and uniforms, and also offered a pension and housing from the newly formed People's Republic of China. However, many of the soldiers chose to destroy their memorabilia and hid their history during the Cultural Revolution due to persecution from the Red Guards.

Legacy

Xie Jinyuan's body was interred in a small garden along Singapore Road (now Yao Road) where his bunk used to be. In 1947 the Shanghai city government renamed Jiaoyuan Park (where the soldiers lived) as Jinyuan Park, and renamed an elementary school in the vicinity 12th District Jinyuan National Elementary School. The road to the west of the warehouse was renamed Jinyuan Road.

On 16 April 1983, Xie's grave was moved to the Wanguo Public Mausoleum, among other Chinese patriots buried there. In the same year, the barracks area was rebuilt and named Jinyuan Alley. In March 1986 the city council of Xie's hometown, Jiaoling, Guangdong, set up a monument in his honour, and his alma mater Jiankeng Elementary School was renamed Jinyuan Elementary School.

The renovated Sihang Warehouse (including an additional level and a new wing) is still standing, and part of it is now a repository of documents, photos and journals from the Battle of Shanghai. Most of the warehouse is still what it was meant to be—a furniture warehouse—and there is even a bowling alley on the third floor.

In 2005, to celebrate the 60th anniversary of the Chinese victory in the Second Sino-Japanese War, as well as the Allied victory in World War II, China Telecom released a set of themed telephone cards. One card featured Sihang Warehouse and Xie Jinyuan.

The story of the Eight Hundred Heroes has been made into the movies 800 Heroes (1938), Eight Hundred Heroes (1977), and The Eight Hundred (2020).

Gallery

References

External links

 
 Brigitte Lin page on 1976 movie
 Chinese Movie Database page on the 1938 movie
 Chinese-American leaders petition the mayor of Shanghai for the preservation of Sihang Warehouse 
 Old survivors visit graves of old comrades-in-arms 
 Structural Analysis of Sihang Warehouse (Abstract) 

Sihang Warehouse
1937 in Japan
20th century in Shanghai
Battles of the Second Sino-Japanese War
Conflicts in 1937
November 1937 events
October 1937 events